Ellbach is a river of Bavaria, Germany, in the district Bad Tölz-Wolfratshausen.

The Ellbach springs west of the hamlet  (belongs to Bad Tölz). It is a right tributary of the Isar in Bad Tölz.

See also
List of rivers of Bavaria

References

Rivers of Bavaria
Rivers of Germany